Luo Mu (1622–1706) was a painter, poet and prose writer born in Jiangxi. He spent most of his life in the capital Nanchang. He was noted for his landscape paintings, especially of mountains, and for what would be termed "The JiangXi Style". His personality was said to be convivial and he counted Xu Yuxi amongst his friends.

Sources
Chinese Paintings in the Ashmolean Museum Oxford(100) Oxford 
China on-site

Qing dynasty painters
1622 births
1706 deaths
People from Ganzhou
Painters from Jiangxi